Gustav Bachmann (July 13, 1860 in Cammin, Rostock – August 31, 1943 in Kiel) was a German naval officer, and an admiral in World War I.

Life

Family 

Bachmann was the son of the farmer Julius Bachmann (1828—1890) and his wife Anna Bachmann, born Raspe (1830—1914). He married Ella Holzapfel on July 14, 1888. They had two children, a boy and a girl.

Military career 

After his completion of high school in Rostock, Bachmann joined the German Imperial Navy as a cadet on April 21, 1877. He completed basic training and went on the frigate  from April 21, 1877, to September 19, 1877. More training followed on the artillery training ship  and the armored frigate . He attended the German Naval Academy from September 20, 1877, to April 14, 1878.  On June 16, 1878, Bachmann was promoted to midshipman.

From June 4 to October 3, 1878, he served on the armored frigate  and from October 4, 1878, to October 6, 1880, he served on the warship . After another visit to the German Naval Academy from October 7, 1880, to October 29, 1881, he was on the artillery training ship  and subsequently worked as a company officer until December 21, 1881. On November 16, 1880, he had been promoted to lieutenant. From 1880 to 1884 he was in the II. Sailors Division, II.

On May 18, 1884, he became commander of the torpedo boat Sicher. Until the end of September, he worked on further trials of torpedo boats as their commander. From October 4, 1884, to August 9, 1886, Bachmann sailed as deck officer on the cruiser frigate . In this period, on January 15, 1885, he promoted to lieutenant. After serving on Bismarck, Bachmann served in the II. Sailors Division and as a watch officer on the cruiser frigate . From January 1, 1887, until April 1887, he served as adjutant first in Berlin and then worked at the Kaiserliche Werft Wilhelmshaven until October 5, 1890.

After October 1890, Bachmann visited the Naval Academy in Kiel. He was promoted on October 13, 1891, to lieutenant, on May 21, 1898, to lieutenant commander and on January 27, 1903, to commander. He was employed in many different commands and staffs, so from April 1901 to April 1903 he became chief of staff of the East Asia Squadron.

From October 1903 to September 29, 1905, Bachmann worked as an instructor at the Naval Academy and here became a sea captain on April 1, 1904. From September 30, 1903, to September 30, 1907, he was commander of the battleship  and afterwards on the Board of the Central Department of the Navy Office under Admiral Alfred von Tirpitz. He remained in this position until October 31, 1910, and was promoted on January 27, 1909, to rear admiral. He was promoted again to vice admiral on September 5, 1911.

Subsequent to his time in the Reichsmarineamt, Bachmann was commander of the reconnaissance ships and remained so until September 30, 1913. After applying to the Chief of the Naval Station of the Baltic from October 1, 1913, to July 22, 1914, he was provisionally full-time employed as chief of the Naval station from July 23, 1914, to August 2, 1914. He was also governor of the German war port of Kiel.

On February 2, 1915, Bachmann was Chief of the Naval Staff. On March 22, 1915, he was promoted to admiral. On September 5, 1915, Bachmann had to vacate the post of admiral. There were disagreements with the political leadership on the issues of anti-submarine warfare. He advocated for unrestricted submarine warfare against the British and bombing of civilian targets. His conflicting views with Kaiser Wilhelm II forced him to resign. He returned to the position of chief of the naval station Baltic and governor of the German naval port of Kiel . From October 28, 1918, to December 13, 1918, he was subordinate to the Secretary of the Admiralty, and then retired.

He lived in Göttingen, later in Kiel, where he died at 83 years old.

Awards 
The Red Eagle, First Class with Oak Leaves and Swords
The Crown II . Class with star 
Knight's Cross of the Royal House Order of Hohenzollern
Iron Cross (1914 ) II . And I. class 
Prussian Service Cross
Bavarian Military Merit, First Class with swords
Hamburg Hanseatic Cross
Mecklenburgisches Militärverdienstkreuz
Ehrengroßkomtur the Oldenburg House and Merit of Duke Peter Friedrich Ludwig
Friedrich-August Cross I. class
Grand Cross of the Order of Albert with golden star and swords
Commander First Class of the Ducal Saxe- Ernestine House Order
Ehrenkreuz III . Class of Lippe House Order
Grand Cross of the Order of Frederick with swords

References

Bibliography

1860 births
1943 deaths
Imperial German Navy admirals of World War I
Admirals of the Imperial German Navy
Recipients of the Iron Cross (1914), 1st class
Recipients of the Military Merit Order (Bavaria), 1st class
Military personnel from Mecklenburg-Western Pomerania
People from Rostock (district)